Hesar Khorvan Rural District is a rural district (dehestan) in Mohammadiyeh District, Alborz County, Qazvin Province, Iran. At the 2006 census, its population was 8,329, in 2,194 families.  The rural district has 11 villages.

References 

Rural Districts of Qazvin Province
Alborz County